Andrew Jackson  is a 1928 bronze sculpture of Andrew Jackson by Belle Kinney Scholz and Leopold Scholz,  installed in the United States Capitol, in Washington D.C., as part of the National Statuary Hall Collection. It is one of two statues donated by the state of Tennessee. The statue was accepted into the collection by Senator Kenneth McKellar on April 16, 1928.

See also

 1928 in art
 Equestrian statue of Andrew Jackson, Lafayette Square, Washington, D.C.
 List of sculptures of presidents of the United States

References

External links
 

1928 establishments in Washington, D.C.
1928 sculptures
Bronze sculptures in Washington, D.C.
Monuments and memorials in Washington, D.C.
Jackson, Andrew
Sculptures of men in Washington, D.C.
Statues of Andrew Jackson